This is a list of multicultural mass media in the Greater Toronto Area.

Greater Toronto Area
Toronto
Multicultural media